The Kaleshwaram Lift Irrigation Project (KLIP) is a multi-purpose irrigation project on the Godavari River in Kaleshwaram, Bhupalpally, Telangana, India. Currently the world's largest multi-stage lift irrigation project, its farthest upstream influence is at the confluence of the Pranhita and Godavari rivers. It remains untapped as its course is principally through dense forests and other ecologically sensitive zones such as wildlife sanctuaries.

The project aims to produce a total of 240 TMC (195 from Medigadda Barrage, 20 from Sripada Yellampalli project and 25 from groundwater), of which 169 has been allocated for irrigation, 30 for Hyderabad municipal water, 16 for miscellaneous industrial uses and 10 for drinking water in nearby villages, with the remainder being estimated evaporation loss.

On 21 June 2019, the project was opened by Telangana Governor E. S. L. Narasimhan and Chief minister K. Chandrashekar Rao. National Green Tribunal declared the Scheme is constructed without following the statuary provisions with regard to environmental aspects.

Four major pumping facilities manage the project's outflow, the largest at Ramadugu (Medaram, Annaram and Sundilla being the others) is also likely to be the largest in Asia once consistent measurements are available, requiring seven  pumps designed and manufactured specifically for the project by the BHEL.
The Engineering giant Megha Engineering and Infrastructures Limited built 15 of 22 Pump houses and undertook major part of the project.

Project details

In addition to constructing new reservoirs, Kaleshwaram also rejuvenates existing ones.

Existing reservoirs

New reservoirs

Links & Irrigated Command Area/Ayacut (Acres) 

Link-I: From Medigadda Barrage on Godavari River to Sripada Yellampalli Project (30,000 acres)
Link-II: From Sripada Yellampalli Project to Mid Manair Dam
Link-III: From Mid Manair Dam to Upper Manair Reservoir (86,150 acres)
Link-IV: From upper Manair Dam to Konda Pochamma Reservoir (595,754 acres)
Link-V: From Anicut to Chityala (243,500 acres)
Link-VI: From Sri Komaravelli Mallanna Sagar to Singur Dam (280,296 acres)
Link-VII: From SRSP Foreshore to Nizam Sagar Canals and to Dilawarpur and Hangarga village for Nirmal and Mudhole Constituency (590,000 acres)

Total: 1,65,700 acres (New ayacut) Apart from: 1,875,00+ acres (Stabilisation of existing ayacut)

Gravity Canals & Tunnels for distribution 
1. Gravity Canal - 1,531 km

2. Gravity Tunnel - 203 km

3. Pressure Mains / Delivery Mains - 98 km

Link-I: From Medigadda Barrage on Godavari River to Sripada Yellampalli Project

Water will be reverse pumped from the confluence point of Godavari and Pranhita Rivers to Sripada Yellampalli Project with the help of 3 barrages (Medigadda, Annaram and Sundilla) and 3 lifts.

As of June 2019, lifts are being commissioned with provision to lift 2 TMC (56,63,36,93,184 liters) of water per day from Medigadda. The water is lifted to backwaters of Annaram barrage. Again from Annaram barrage to Sundilla barrage. Finally from Sundilla to Sripada Yellampalli Project. Civil works are being executed to lift 3 TMC per day but pumps are being installed to lift only 2 TMC. If need be, only pumps would need to be installed to increase capacity by one more TMC.

Link-II: From Sripada Yellampalli Project to Mid Manair Dam

A new balancing reservoir is also being proposed in the outskirts of Hyderabad of 20–30 TMC to store water. The water will be supplied to this balancing reservoir in the same link.

Link-V: From Anicut to Chityala

From Anicut, a series of gravity canals and a small tunnel of 1.2 km are planned to transfer water to Gandamalla Reservoir and Baswapuram Reservoir. Thereafter, gravity canals are planned towards Chityal Mandal and its villages.

Link-VI: From Sri Komaravelli Mallanna Sagar to Singur Dam

From Sri Komaravelli Mallanna Sagar, another sequence of gravity canals, tunnels and lifts are used to transfer water to Singur Dam. Apart from that, if need be, water can be transferred to Nizam Sagar Project and from there, to SRSP.

Link-VII: From SRSP Foreshore to Nizam Sagar Canals and to Dilwarpur and Hangarga village for Nirmal and Mudhole Constituency

From the foreshore waters of SRSP, water will be transferred to reservoirs at Hangarga and Dilwapur villages. Apart from this, existing reservoirs like Masani Tank and kondem Cheruvu will also be linked. Canals under Nizam Sagar will also be irrigated.

Project Economics 
The project requires about 5,900 MW of electricity to run its several large water pumps. Assuming, on average, the pumps require constant running for two months during the monsoon period, 24 hours a day, the total electricity consumption would be 849 crore units. Taking a unit electricity charge of Rs. 8.0 per kWh, the annual electricity cost is going to be Rs. 7000 crores per year. Assuming the project irrigates about 15 lakh acres, the electricity cost for irrigation is about Rs. 46,666 per acre per year. The chief minister has said that the project requires about Rs. 5000 crore annually for electricity charges. On the other hand, the state irrigation department had allocated Rs.7000 crores for electricity charges in its 2020 budget.  

The project was mainly funded with the money obtained through loans. Assuming an existing loan of Rs. 80,000 crore, at an interest rate of 6% that needs to paid up over a period of 30 years, the annual loan repayment charge is about Rs. 5760 crores per year. This implies an additional charge of Rs. 38,400 per acre per year towards the loan repayment. Therefore, the total cost of irrigation per acre is approximately Rs. 85,000 per acre per year. On the other hand, the net profit from the cultivation of the main crop i.e., paddy, could be expected to be around Rs.40,000 per acre per year, assuming two crops in a year. These numbers raise questions about the financial viability of the project.

Project Execution 
Indian Public sector Enterprise BHEL is executing this project and has already commissioned 16 pumping units.

Environmental law violations 
In October 2020, the National Green Tribunal, India's court for environmental issues, directed the Telangana government to halt work on the KLIP except the drinking water supply component. A petition had been filed by a farmer from Siddipet district, whose land was affected by the KLIP. The National Green Tribunal found, on hearing his petition, that the environmental clearances for the KLIP had not been obtained before the project, as is required by law, but had been granted by the Union Government of India after work on the project had already begun by the Telangana government. The National Green Tribunal has directed the Indian government's  Ministry of Environment, Forests and Climate Change to constitute a committee to investigate the illegally granted clearances, and to file a report with them within six months.

See also

 Lower Manair Dam
 SRSP Flood Flow Canal
 Ganga Water Lift Project
 Pranahita Chevella
 Alisagar lift irrigation scheme
 Sri Komaram Bheem Project
 Devadula lift irrigation scheme
 Icchampally Project
 Singur Dam

References

(Telangana India)

Dams on the Godavari River
Dams in Telangana
Hydroelectric power stations in Telangana
Inter-state disputes in India
Irrigation projects
Irrigation in India
Godavari basin
Buildings and structures in Telangana
2019 establishments in Telangana